Marcos Danilo Padilha (31 July 1985 – 28 November 2016), simply known as Danilo, was a Brazilian footballer who last played for Chapecoense as a goalkeeper.

Danilo was one of the 71 people who died in the LaMia Airlines Flight 2933 crash on 28 November 2016.

Club career
Born in Jussara, Paraná, Danilo made his senior debut with hometown's Cianorte. After subsequently playing for lower teams in the same state (notably Operário and Arapongas), he joined Londrina in May 2011.

In September 2013 Danilo joined Chapecoense on loan until the end of the year. He made his professional debut on 23 November, starting in a 2–1 away win against Icasa for the Série B championship; it was his maiden appearance in the competition, as his side finished second and was promoted to Série A for the first time ever.

In January 2014 Danilo joined Chape permanently, and made his top level debut on 19 April 2014, starting and keeping a clean sheet in a 0–0 home draw against Coritiba. He was an ever-present figure during the campaign, being an important defensive unit as his side maintained its division status.

Personal life
Danilo lived in Chapecó with his wife Leticia and their son, Lorenzo.

Death
Danilo and his club were aboard LaMia Airlines Flight 2933 when it crashed in Colombia on 28 November 2016. Danilo was initially believed to have survived the crash and to have died the next day at a hospital in La Ceja, but later the hospital stated that he had never been brought in but rather had died at the scene of the accident.

Career statistics

Honours
Chapecoense
Campeonato Catarinense: 2016
 Copa Sudamericana: 2016 (posthumously)

References

External links

1985 births
2016 deaths
Sportspeople from Paraná (state)
Brazilian footballers
Association football goalkeepers
Campeonato Brasileiro Série A players
Campeonato Brasileiro Série B players
Campeonato Brasileiro Série D players
Atlético Clube Paranavaí players
Londrina Esporte Clube players
Associação Chapecoense de Futebol players
Footballers killed in the LaMia Flight 2933 crash